C. eminens may refer to:

 Calamagrostis eminens, a grass species
 Calliostoma eminens, a sea snail species